The Lithuania national football team represents Lithuania in international football and is controlled by the Lithuanian Football Federation, the governing body for football in Lithuania. They played their first match in 1923. In 1940, Lithuania was occupied by the Soviet Union; the country regained its independence in 1990 and played their first match thereafter against Georgia on 27 May of that year.

Although Lithuania has never qualified for the FIFA World Cup, nor the UEFA European Championship, they have successfully participated in the regional Baltic Cup tournament, which takes place every two years between Lithuania and their Baltic rivals, Latvia and Estonia. Lithuania has won the Baltic Cup championship 11 times, only Latvia has won it more frequently. Despite this Lithuania holds the record for winning the most consecutive Baltic Cup championships, four titles in a row from 1996 to 2000.

From 2012 until 2022, the national team played their home matches at the LFF Stadium in Vilnius.

History
On 24 June 1923, Lithuania played their first ever game, at the Lietuvos Fizinio Lavinimosi Sąjunga Stadionas, resulting in a 5–0 loss against Estonia. In 1924, Lithuania entered the 1924 Olympics in France, losing 9–0 against Switzerland on 25 May 1924. Two days later, Lithuania suffered a 10–0 loss to Egypt, a record defeat to date. During the early years of the Lithuanian national team, Lithuania regularly played Baltic neighbours Estonia and Latvia, with Lithuania's first win coming in a 2–1 away win against Estonia on 24 August 1924 in Tallinn. In 1930, Lithuania won the third edition of the Baltic Cup in Kaunas. On 13 October 1940, Lithuania played their final game for just shy of 50 years, a 4–3 win against Latvia, following the first Soviet annexation of the country.

Lithuania's first game following the declaration of independence in 1990 was a 2–2 draw against Georgia in Tbilisi on 27 May 1990. In the 1990s, Lithuania established a respectable presence in the World Cup and European Championship qualifiers: third place in their group in both Euro 1996 and the 1998 World Cup qualifiers. In the Euro 2004 qualifiers, they were once again contenders for qualification and managed an away draw with Germany and a home win over Scotland; however, a 1–0 defeat to Scotland in the final game ended their hopes. Although finishing fifth in their 2006 World Cup qualifying group, Lithuania were nevertheless competitive.

Lithuania drew with world champions Italy 1–1 in Naples in a Euro 2008 qualifying game on 2 September 2006, in the first competitive game that Italy played since the World Cup final.

On 6 September 2008, Lithuania defeated Romania 3–0 in a 2010 World Cup qualifier. The victory was regarded by many as "a historic win." It was followed by another successful 2–0 performance against Austria in Marijampolė on 10 September 2008.

Recent results and upcoming fixtures

2022

2023

Coaching staff

Managers history

Players

Current squad
 The following players were called up for the 2022 Baltic Cup tournament.
 Match dates: 16 and 19 November 2022
 Opposition:  and 
 Caps and goals correct as of: 19 November 2022, after the match against 

 

Recent call-ups
The following players have been called up for the team in the last twelve months.

Notes
PRE = Preliminary squad.
WD = The player withdrew from the current squad due to non-injury issue.
INJ = It is not part of the current squad due to injury.
RET = Retired from the national team.

Player records

Players in bold are still active with Lithuania.

Most capped players

Top goalscorers

Competitive record
FIFA World Cup

UEFA European Championship

UEFA Nations League

*Draws include knockout matches decided via penalty shoot-out.
**Group stage played home and away. Flag shown represents host nation for the finals stage.

Baltic Cup

HonoursBaltic Cup Winners (10):''' 1930, 1935, 1991, 1992, 1994, 1996, 1997, 1998, 2005, 2010

Head-to-head record

As of 31 March 2021.

See also

 Lithuania national under-21 football team
 Lithuania national under-19 football team
 Lithuania national under-18 football team
 Lithuania national under-17 football team

References

External links

 Official website 
 Lithuania at FIFA 
 Lithuania at UEFA
 All Lithuanian Team Games 1923–1930
 Reports for all matches of Lithuania national team
 Lithuanian football videos Lithuanian Football TV

 
European national association football teams